The term Kerinci can refer to:
Mount Kerinci
Lake Kerinci
Kerinci people, an ethnic group in Kerinci Regency, Jambi
Kerinci language
Kerinci Regency, a regency of Jambi
Kerinci Seblat National Park